The 2013 South American Rhythmic Gymnastics Championships were held in Santiago, Chile, December 10–15, 2013.

Medalists

References 

2013 in gymnastics
Rhythmic Gymnastics,2013
International gymnastics competitions hosted by Chile
2013 in Chilean sport